Geomydoecus oregonus is a species of louse known to affect the Camas pocket gopher (Thomomys bulbivorus).

References 

Lice
Parasites of rodents
Endemic fauna of Oregon
Insects described in 1971